was a  after Enkyō and before Shōwa. This period spanned 11 months from April 1311 through February 1312.

Change of era
 1311 : The new era name was created to mark an event or series of events. The previous era ended and the new one commenced in Enkyō 4.

Events of the Ōchō era
Initially, former-Emperor Fushimi administered the court up through the time he took the tonsure as a Buddhist monk, which happened after this nengō ended.
 
 1311 (Ōchō 1, 1st month): The sesshō, Takatsukasa Fuyuhira assisted at Emperor Hanazono's coming of age ceremony.
 1311 (Ōchō 1, 3rd month): Takatsukasa Fuyuhira took on a new role as kampaku.
 1311 (Ōchō 1, 9th month): Hōjō Morotoki, who was the tenth shikken of the Kamakura Bakufu, dies at the age of 37 years.

Notes

References
 Nussbaum, Louis-Frédéric and Käthe Roth. (2005).  Japan encyclopedia. Cambridge: Harvard University Press. ;  OCLC 58053128
 Titsingh, Isaac. (1834). Nihon Odai Ichiran; ou,  Annales des empereurs du Japon.  Paris: Royal Asiatic Society, Oriental Translation Fund of Great Britain and Ireland. OCLC 5850691
 Varley, H. Paul. (1980). A Chronicle of Gods and Sovereigns: Jinnō Shōtōki of Kitabatake Chikafusa. New York: Columbia University Press. ;  OCLC 6042764
 Debnath, Neela (March 8, 2018). "Wild Wild Country on Netflix: When is Wild Wild Country released on Netflix?". Daily Express. Express Newspapers. Retrieved March 13, 2018.
 HT Correspondent (March 1, 2018). "Wild Wild Country trailer: New Netflix series will take you behind the controversial history of Osho". The Hindustan Times. Retrieved March 13, 2018.
 Turnquist, Kristi (March 14, 2018). "Netflix documentary on Rajneeshees in Oregon revisits an amazing, enraging true story". The Oregonian. Retrieved March 23, 2018.
"Wild Wild Country". Sundance Film Festival. The Sundance Institute. Retrieved March 13, 2018.
Finberg, Daniel. "'Wild Wild Country': TV Review | Sundance 2018". The Hollywood Reporter. Prometheus Global Media. Retrieved March 13, 2018.
Schager, Nick (March 12, 2018). "Inside the Crazy Sex Cult That Invaded Oregon". The Daily Beast. Retrieved March 13, 2018.
"Wild Wild Country (Season 1)". Rotten Tomatoes. Fandango Media. Retrieved April 13, 2018.
Allen, Nick (16 March 2018). "Netflix Docuseries Wild Wild Country is Fascinating Entertainment". RogerEbert.com. Ebert Digital LLC. Retrieved April 13, 2018.

External links
 National Diet Library, "The Japanese Calendar" -- historical overview plus illustrative images from library's collection

Japanese eras
1310s in Japan